Abu Garva-e Yek (also Romanized as Abū Garvā-e Yek; also known as Abū Garvā, Abū Gervā, Abū Gorvā, and Abū Gorveh) is a village in Shoaybiyeh-ye Sharqi Rural District, Shadravan District, Shushtar County, Khuzestan Province, Iran. At the 2006 census, its population was 530, in 96 families.

References 

Populated places in Shushtar County